Gábor Szabó (born 6 December 1967) is an Australian judoka. He competed in the men's half-middleweight event at the 1996 Summer Olympics.

References

External links
 

1967 births
Living people
Australian male judoka
Olympic judoka of Australia
Judoka at the 1996 Summer Olympics
Sportspeople from Budapest